Berlin is a city in Colquitt County, Georgia, United States. As of the 2020 census, the city had a population of 511.

History
Berlin was incorporated as a town in 1910. A post office has been in operation at Berlin since 1910. The community was named after Berlin, in Germany. Upon American entry into World War I, the town was renamed "Lens" due to Anti-German sentiment. The name "Berlin" was soon afterwards restored.

Geography
Berlin is located at  (31.067405, -83.623649).

Climate

Demographics

As of the census of 2000, there were 595 people, 196 households, and 145 families residing in the town. The racial makeup of the town was 64.87% White, 11.93% African American, 1.68% Asian, 19.66% from other races, and 1.85% from two or more races. Hispanic or Latino of any race were 24.87% of the population.

There were 196 households, out of which 40.3% had children under the age of 18 living with them, 57.7% were married couples living together, 13.3% had a female householder with no husband present, and 26.0% were non-families. 20.4% of all households were made up of individuals, and 11.2% had someone living alone who was 65 years of age or older.  The average household size was 2.84 and the average family size was 3.25.

In the town, the population was spread out, with 27.7% under the age of 18, 16.0% from 18 to 24, 25.5% from 25 to 44, 19.7% from 45 to 64, and 11.1% who were 65 years of age or older.  The median age was 29 years. For every 100 females, there were 104.5 males.  For every 100 females age 18 and over, there were 107.7 males.

The median income for a household in the town was $33,438, and the median income for a family was $39,167. Males had a median income of $37,500 versus $20,536 for females. The per capita income for the town was $15,461.  About 9.1% of families and 12.6% of the population were below the poverty line, including 9.3% of those under age 18 and 29.2% of those age 65 or over.

References

External links

Towns in Colquitt County, Georgia
Towns in Georgia (U.S. state)